Baty may refer to:

 Baty International - acquired by Bowers Group
 Brett Baty (born 1999), American baseball player
 Gaston Baty (1885–1952), French playwright and theatre director
 Greg Baty (born 1964), former American football player
 Richard Baty (died 1758), Scottish Anglican divine
 Patrick Baty (born 1956), British historian of paint and colour
 Thomas Baty (1869-1954), British transgender lawyer, author and activist

See also
Batty